The IMOCA 60 Class yacht Virbac also referred to as Virbac-Paprec was designed by Farr Yacht Design and launched in 2003 after being built by Cookson Boats in there New Zealand yard. The boat was lost during the 2008-2009 Vendee Globe when the boat stopped at Kerguelen Islands but washed ashore by a gust of wind. It was eventually recovered and put on the "Marion Dufresne" and brought back to Reunion Island before being written of and destroyed.

Racing results

References 

Individual sailing yachts
2000s sailing yachts
Sailing yachts designed by Farr Yacht Design
Vendée Globe boats
IMOCA 60